
Carl Becker (16 January 1895  – 24 March 1966) was a German general during World War II, who commanded several divisions.  He was a recipient of the Knight's Cross of the Iron Cross with Oak Leaves of Nazi Germany.

Arning surrendered to the Red Army troops in the course of the Soviet Prague Offensive in 1945. Convicted in the Soviet Union as a war criminal, he was held until 1955.

Becker belonged to the generation of military officers of the First World War, which largely corresponded with parts of the Nazi ideology prevailed and in the second half of World War II became an important pillar of the military system.

Awards and decorations
 Iron Cross (1914) 2nd Class (23 July 1915) & 1st Class (17 June 1917)
 Clasp to the Iron Cross (1939) 2nd Class (12 October 1939) & 1st Class (10 June 1940)
 Honour Roll Clasp of the Army (29 September 1941)
 German Cross in Gold on 18 October 1941 as Oberst in Infanterie-Regiment 18
 Knight's Cross of the Iron Cross with Oak Leaves
 Knight's Cross on 29 October 1942 as Oberst and commander of Infanterie-Regiment 18
 829th Oak Leaves on 14 April 1945 as Generalleutnant and commander of 253. Infanterie-Division

References

Citations

Bibliography

 
 
 

1895 births
1966 deaths
Lieutenant generals of the German Army (Wehrmacht)
Recipients of the Gold German Cross
Recipients of the Knight's Cross of the Iron Cross with Oak Leaves
German prisoners of war in World War II held by the Soviet Union
Recipients of the clasp to the Iron Cross, 1st class
People from Varel
Military personnel from Lower Saxony